¿Quién?, is a Mexican telenovela produced by Guillermo Diazayas for Televisa in 1973. Starring Silvia Pinal and Joaquín Cordero.

Cast 
Silvia Pinal
Joaquín Cordero
Félix González
Gustavo Rojo
Miguel Manzano

References

External links 

Mexican telenovelas
1973 telenovelas
Televisa telenovelas
Spanish-language telenovelas
Television shows based on comics
1973 Mexican television series debuts
1973 Mexican television series endings